= Garrett's Almshouses =

Grade II listed almshouses on Wood Street, Chipping Barnet, England

Coordinates: 51.6530°N 0.2059°W

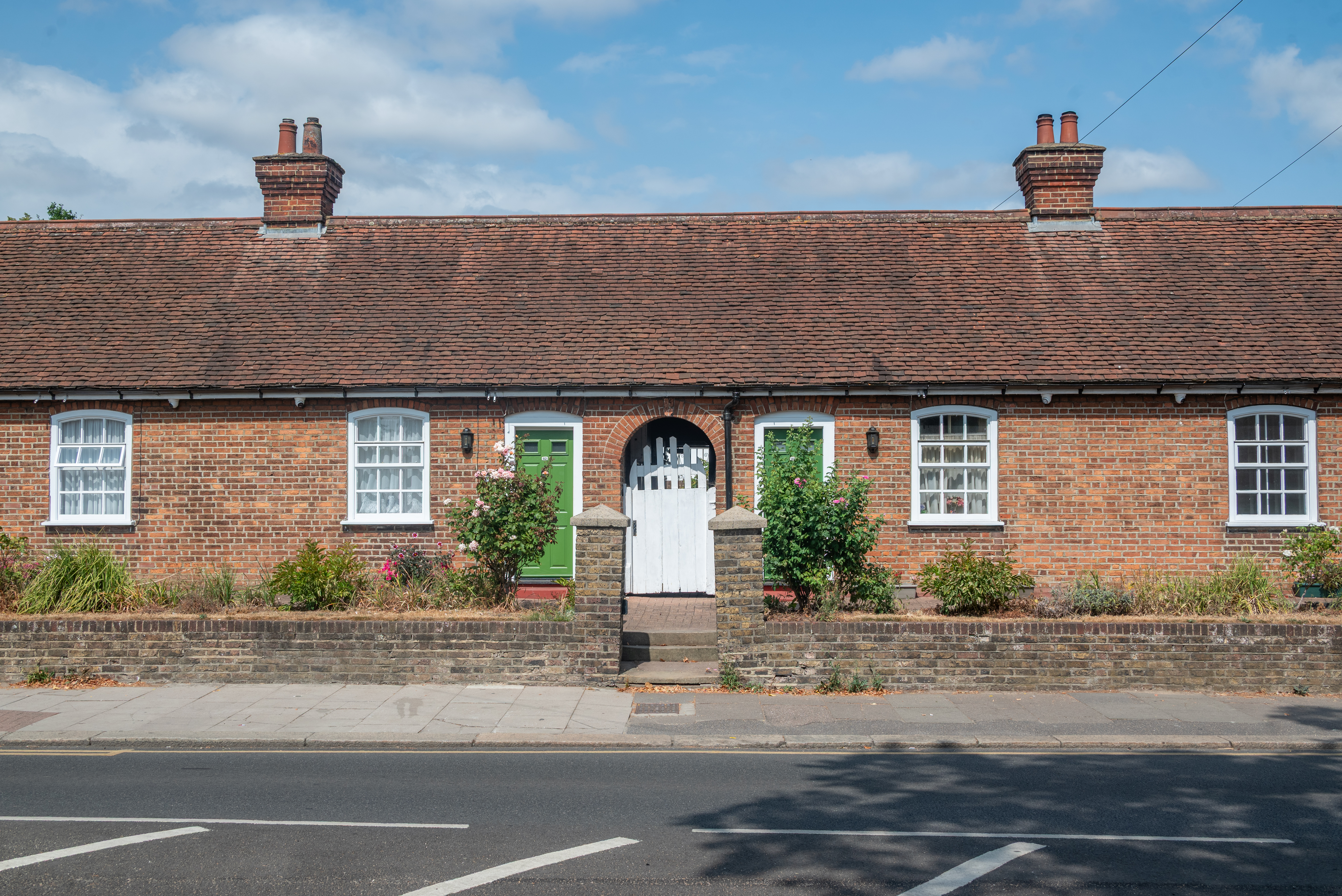
Garrett's Almshouses

Garrett's Almshouses are Grade II listed almshouses on Wood Street, Chipping Barnet. The houses were constructed in 1729.
